The Franklin O-500 (company designation 6AL-500 and 6A8-215) was an American air-cooled aircraft engine that first ran in the mid-1940s. The engine was of six-cylinder, horizontally-opposed layout and displaced .

Variants
6AL-500(alternative designation)  at 2,500 rpm, with crankcase/prop-shaft  extension for pusher installation.
6A8-215-B8F at 2,500 rpm, with crankcase/prop-shaft  extension for pusher installation.
6A8-215-B9Fsame as B8F but with different ignition components.

Applications
Convair 106 Skycoach
Piaggio P.136
Republic RC-3 Seabee
Waco Aristocraft

Specifications (6AL-500 / 6AB-215-B8F)

See also

References

Further reading
 
 
 

Franklin aircraft engines
1940s aircraft piston engines
Boxer engines